Herbaspirillum lusitanum is a nitrogen-fixing bacterium found in root nodules of common beans (Phaseolus vulgaris). Phylogenetic analyses have shown this bacterium belongs to the genus Herbaspirillum. H. lusitanum lacks the nif gene. A nodD-like gene is present, but no other nod genes have been identified. The lack of nif and nod genes suggests H. lusitanum is an opportunistic bacterium capable of colonizing root nodules, but is unable to fix nitrogen.

References

External links
Type strain of Herbaspirillum lusitanum at BacDive -  the Bacterial Diversity Metadatabase

Burkholderiales
Bacteria described in 2003